Richard Bailey was elected to Liverpool City Council on 1 November 1931, as a Conservative for Walton Ward. He remained unseated until 1948 when he was elected as an alderman by the City Council on 5 May 1948.

He served as Lord Mayor of Liverpool from 1955–56.

References

Mayors of Liverpool
Year of birth missing
Year of death missing